Loš i mlad (Bad and young) is the first studio album by the Serbian new wave band Bulevar, released by PGP RTB in 1981. The album was remastered and released on CD in 2006 on the compilation album Nestašni dečaci by PGP RTS, the successor of PGP RTB.

Track listing

Personnel

Bulevar
 Nenad Stamatović — guitar, arranged by (tracks 1, 2 and 9), music by (tracks 1, 2, 4, 9 and 10)
 Predrag Jakovljević — drums, arranged by (track 10)
 Dejan Cukić — vocals, lyrics by (tracks 3, 6, 7 and 8), music by (track 3), arranged by (track 4)
 Branko Isaković — bass, arranged by (track 6)
 Dragan Mitrić — keyboards, arranged by (tracks 7 and 8), music by (tracks 5, 6, 7 and 8), lyrics by (track 4 and 5)

Additional personnel
 Jugoslav Vlahović — artwork by [design], photography
 Bebi Dol — backing vocals
 Marina Tucaković — lyrics by (tracks 1, 2, 4 and 9)
 Vita Blažić — photography
 Tahir Durkalić — recorded by
 Momčilo Bajagić — lyrics by (track 2)
 Oliver Mandić — backing vocals (track 8)

References

 EX YU ROCK enciklopedija 1960-2006, Janjatović Petar; 
 Loš i mlad at Discogs

1981 debut albums
Bulevar (band) albums
PGP-RTB albums